Perry Henzell (7 March 1936 – 30 November 2006) was a Jamaican director. He directed the first Jamaican feature film, The Harder They Come (1972), co-written by Trevor D. Rhone and starring Jimmy Cliff.

Life and career

Henzell, whose ancestors included Huguenot glassblowers and an old English family who had made their fortune growing sugar cane on Antigua, was born in Annotto Bay, Saint Mary Parish, Jamaica, and grew up on the Caymanas sugar cane estate near Kingston. He was sent to Shrewsbury School in the United Kingdom at the age of 14 and later attended McGill University in Montreal, Canada, in 1953 and 1954. He then dropped out of this school, choosing instead to hitchhike around Europe. He eventually got work as a stagehand at the BBC. He returned in the 1950s to Jamaica, where he directed advertisements for some years until he began work on The Harder They Come with co-writer Trevor D. Rhone.

In 1965 Henzell married Sally Densham.

Henzell also shot some footage for what was planned as his next film, No Place Like Home, in Harder's aftermath in 1974, but he went broke before he could finish the film. Fed up by this, and the lack of finance for further production, he went on to become a writer, publishing his first novel, Power Game, in 1982. Both were meant to complete a planned trilogy of films centring on Ivanhoe Martin. The footage for No Place Like Home was lost. Years later, he came across editing tapes in a lab in New York. Just to have a sense of completion, he worked on the project. When he showed it to a few friends, their response was enthusiastic. He eventually was able to retrieve the original footage. A rough cut of No Place Like Home, which features music from Bob Marley, Toots and the Maytals, The Three Degrees, and Marcia Griffiths, was screened for the public at the 31st annual Toronto International Film Festival in September 2006 at the Cumberland Theatre; it was sold out. Film leads Carl Bradshaw (The Harder They Come, Smile Orange, Countryman) and Susan O'Meara attended and answered audience questions with Henzell after the screening. The film was also screened at the Flashpoint Film Festival at the beginning of December 2006 in Negril. A fully restored version was premiered in 2019.

Henzell died of cancer on 30 November 2006, aged 70, and is survived by his widow Sally and three children: Justine, Toni-Ann and Jason.

References

External links
Biography of Perry Henzell

Toronto Film Festival Profile of No Place Like Home

1936 births
2006 deaths
Deaths from cancer in Jamaica
Jamaican film directors
Jamaican film producers
Jamaican people of English descent
McGill University alumni
People educated at Shrewsbury School
People from Saint Mary Parish, Jamaica